The 1988 International cricket season was from May 1988 to September 1988.

Season overview

May

West Indies in England

August

Sri Lanka in England

References

1988 in cricket